Beat You Up may refer to:

 "Beat You Up", a song by The Prissteens from Jawbreaker (film), 1999
 "Beat You Up", a song from Killer (Tech N9ne album), 2008

See also
 Beat It Up (disambiguation)
 Beat Me Up (disambiguation)